Sir Howard John Davies (born 12 February 1951) is a British economist and author, who is the chairman of NatWest Group and the former director of the London School of Economics.

He was the first chairman of the Financial Services Authority. Davies was chairman of the Phoenix Group and, until July 2015, chaired the UK Airports Commission. In February 2015, he was appointed chairman of The Royal Bank of Scotland Group, taking up the role from September 2015. RBS Group was renamed NatWest Group in 2020.

Since 2011 he has been a professor at the Paris School of International Affairs, part of Sciences Po. He teaches master's courses on financial regulation and central banking.

Early life
Howard Davies born in Blackley, Manchester, England.

He was educated at Bowker Vale County Primary School and the Manchester Grammar School, where he was the founder editor of The Mancunian, before going as an exchange student to the Memorial University of Newfoundland and to Merton College, University of Oxford, where he gained a Master of Arts degree in modern history and modern languages. He edited the Cherwell newspaper in 1972.

On graduation from Oxford he joined the Foreign and Commonwealth Office in London, working the Western European Department on bilateral relations with Scandinavia, Italy, Austria and the Holy See. In 1974 he became Private Secretary To HM Ambassador in Paris, working for Sir Edward Tomkins and Sir Nicholas Henderson. From 1976 he was on secondment to HM Treasury, where he worked on Nationalised Industry Policy and Aerospace finding (civil and military). He was responsible for the UK participation in the Concorde, Airbus and Tornado programmes, in particular. In 1979 he was awarded a Harkness Fellowship to attend the Stanford Graduate School of Business in California where he obtained a Master of Science degree in management sciences. In 1980 he returned to HM Treasury, where he was principal for monetary policy, from 1980 to 1982.

Career
Davies was employed by McKinsey and Company from 1982 to 1987. From 1985 to 1986 he was special advisor to Chancellor of the Exchequer Nigel Lawson. From 1987 to 1992 he was controller of the Audit Commission. In 1992 he was appointed director general of the Confederation of British Industry, a position he held until 1995, when he was appointed Deputy Governor of the Bank of England. In 1997 Davies was appointed executive chairman of the newly established Financial Services Authority, regulating the whole of the UK financial services industry, serving until 2003.

From 2003 to 2011 Davies was director of the London School of Economics and Political Science. He stepped down from the position on 3 March 2011 following concern over the institution's decision to accept funding from a foundation controlled by the Libyan dictator Muammar Gaddafi's son, Saif, in the LSE–Gaddafi affair.

Davies was a non-executive director of GKN between 1989 and 1995, and a member of the international advisory board of National Westminster Bank from 1991 to 1995. From 1995 to 2004 he was founder chairman of Employers Forum on Age, a body formed to oppose ageism at work. From 2002 to 2010 he was a trustee of the Tate Gallery (where he was interim chair 2008–09), and was a member of the governing body of the Royal Academy of Music from 2004 to 2013. He is patron of Working Families, a campaigning charity which supports the rights of parents in the workplace. In 2004 he was elected to an Honorary Fellowship of Merton College, Oxford and became an independent director of Morgan Stanley, where he chaired the board's risk committee. From 2006 to 2010, Davies was a non-executive director of Paternoster Ltd. Since 2003, he has held membership in the International Advisory Committee of the China Banking and Insurance Regulatory Commission, and, since 2012, has chaired the International Advisory Committee of the China Securities Regulatory Commission. He became chairman of the Royal Bank of Scotland Group in February 2015.

In 2009 Davies was appointed as advisor to the Investment Strategy Committee of GIC Private Limited, formerly known as Government of Singapore Investment Corporation. Two years later he joined its international advisory board. He resigned from both positions in September 2012, on appointment to the chair of the Airports Commission (GIC Private Limited is a part owner of Heathrow). In 2010 he became a non-executive director of Prudential plc, and chair of the Risk Committee, a role he performed until May 2020. In 2011 he joined the Regulatory Advisory Council of Millennium LLP in New York. Also in 2011, he joined the board of the Royal National Theatre, where he was chairman of the finance committee for 4 years. From 2012 to 2015 Davies was a member of the advisory board of the SWIFT Institute. Davies is a council member of the Asian Bureau of Finance and Economic Research in Singapore.

In November 2022, as chairman of NatWest Bank, Davies reportedly told staff that he had been "embarrassed" during a meeting with the IMF after Liz Truss and Kwasi Kwarteng released a mini-budget.

Other
Davies chaired the judges of the Man Booker Prize for fiction in 2007. He was appointed chairman of the trustees of the London Library in November 2015.

He was a character in the David Hare play The Power of Yes which premiered at the London National Theatre in October 2009.

Honours
Davies was appointed a Knight Bachelor in 2000.

Books

 
 

 
 
 ———————-(2022). The Chancellors: steering the British economy in crisis times. Cambridge: Polity Press. 

Davies writes regularly for The Financial Times, Times Higher Education, Project Syndicate and Management Today.

Personal life
Davies is married to Prue Keely, and has two sons.

He is a supporter of Manchester City Football Club and the Lancashire County Cricket Club. He plays cricket for Barnes Common and Powerstock and Hooke cricket clubs.

References

External links

Davies' column archive at Project Syndicate; accessed 17 March 2014.
Business blog at Financial Times; accessed 17 March 2014
Davies' profile at Forbes.com; accessed 17 March 2014. 
Profile at Global Policy; accessed 17 March 2014.
Davies' profile at World Economic Forum; accessed 17 March 2014.
Davies' biodata at Debrett's People of Today; accessed 17 March 2014. 

 

1951 births
Living people
Businesspeople from Manchester
British economists
NatWest Group people
Directors of Morgan Stanley
McKinsey & Company people
Stanford Sloan Fellows
Harkness Fellows
Knights Bachelor
People educated at Manchester Grammar School
Alumni of Merton College, Oxford
New York University faculty
People associated with the London School of Economics
People associated with the Royal Academy of Music
Stanford Graduate School of Business alumni
Deputy Governors of the Bank of England
Fellows of Merton College, Oxford